The 1930 All-Ireland Minor Football Championship was the second staging of the All-Ireland Minor Football Championship, the Gaelic Athletic Association's premier inter-county Gaelic football tournament for boys under the age of 18.

Clare entered the championship as defending champions, however, they were defeated by Mayo in the All-Ireland semi-final.

On 7 September 1930, Dublin won the championship following a 1-3 to 0-5 defeat of Mayo in the All-Ireland final. This was their first All-Ireland title.

Results

Connacht Minor Football Championship

Leinster Minor Football Championship

Munster Minor Football Championship

Ulster Minor Football Championship

All-Ireland Minor Football Championship

Semi-finals

Final

Championship statistics

Miscellaneous

 The Connacht and Ulster Championships are held for the first time.

References

1929
All-Ireland Minor Football Championship